Pine Grove is an unincorporated community in Baldwin County, Alabama, United States. It is located south of Bay Minette.

The community is part of the Daphne–Fairhope–Foley Micropolitan Statistical Area.

Education
Pine Grove is served by the Baldwin County Public Schools system.

Pine Grove Elementary School serves grades Pre-K through 6.  Students continue on to Bay Minette Middle School (grades 7–8) and Baldwin County High School (grades 9–12).

References

Unincorporated communities in Alabama
Unincorporated communities in Baldwin County, Alabama